Türgüt Aykaç (born January 1, 1958 in Adana) is a former boxer from Turkey. At the 1984 Summer Olympics, he won the bronze medal in the men's featherweight division (– 57 kg), alongside Omar Catari of Venezuela. In the semifinals he was defeated by eventual silver medalist Peter Konyegwachie of Nigeria.

He began boxing 1975 in Adanaspor and fought 27 times in the national team. He was one of the three Turkish boxers along with Eyüp Can and Malik Beyleroğlu, who won the first Olympic medals in boxing for Turkey. They were also Turkey's first Olympic medals in other sport than wrestling.

Olympic results 
 1st round bye
 Defeated Raul Trapero (Spain) 5-0
 Defeated Abraham Mieses (Dominican Republic) RSC 3
 Defeated Mohamed Hegazy (Egypt) RSC 1
 Lost to Peter Konyegwachie (Nigeria) 0-5

References

External links
 

1958 births
Sportspeople from Adana
Living people
Featherweight boxers
Olympic boxers of Turkey
Boxers at the 1984 Summer Olympics
Olympic bronze medalists for Turkey
Olympic medalists in boxing
Turkish male boxers
Medalists at the 1984 Summer Olympics
20th-century Turkish people